Haimro Alame (also known as Haimro Almaya and Aimeru Almeya; איימרו עלמיה; born June 8, 1990) is an Ethiopian-born Israeli runner. In the 2014 European Team Championships he took second in the 5000 metres, and in the 2015 European Games in Baku, he came in third in the 5000 m. Alame was as of 2018 the Israeli record holder at 10,000 metres. He qualified in the marathon to represent Israel at the 2020 Summer Olympics.

Early life
Alame was born in Ethiopia, to a Beta Israel (Ethiopian-Jewish) family, and immigrated to Israel with his family in 2004. His track club is Hapoel Athletic Oren Hasharon.

Athlete career
Alame was as of 2019 the Israeli national record holder at 10,000m. As of 2018 his personal bests were 10,000m: 28:09.42; 5000m: 13:52.76; 1500m: 3:47.73.

He came in 1st in the Israeli national championships in the 1500m in 2014, 5000m in 2013/2014/2015/2016, and 10,000m in 2014. Alame won the 2015 Israeli Cross Country Championships (10.7km). In 2013 he set the course record in the 10000m in the Jerusalem Marathon with a time of 31:19. He won the 2017 Tel Aviv International Half Marathon, and came in 2nd in the 2018 Tiberias Half Marathon. In 2018 he came in 10th in the IAAF World Half Marathon team event.

In the 2014 European Team Championships Alame took second in the 5000 m behind Hayle Ibrahimov. Representing Israel at the 2015 European Games in Baku, he came in third in the 5000m, with a time of 14:38.96 min behind Roman Prodius and Hayle Ibrahimov, and earned a bronze medal.

Marathon

In the marathon Alame came in 22nd in Rotterdam in 2017. He won the 2019 Tiberias Marathon with a time of 2:15:16. As of 2020 his personal best in the marathon was 2h07:45.

Alame qualified in the marathon to represent Israel at the 2020 Summer Olympics. He qualified after running the 2019 Valencia Marathon in 2:11:02 hours, the third-best Israeli time ever.

References

External links
 
 
 Haimro Alame at Eurosport (as Aimeru Almeya)
 Haimro Alame at MarathonView.net (as Haimro Almaya)
 

1990 births
Living people
Ethiopian Jews
Ethiopian emigrants to Israel
Citizens of Israel through Law of Return
Israeli male marathon runners
Israeli male middle-distance runners
Israeli male long-distance runners
Israeli male cross country runners
Israeli people of Ethiopian-Jewish descent
Sportspeople of Ethiopian descent
Jewish Israeli sportspeople
Athletes (track and field) at the 2020 Summer Olympics
Olympic athletes of Israel
Athletes (track and field) at the 2015 European Games
European Games medalists in athletics
European Games bronze medalists for Israel